Parilla may refer to:
Parilla, South Australia, a small town on the Mallee Highway in South Australia
Hundred of Parilla, an administrative division in South Australia
Parilla (motorcycle manufacturer), an Italian brand 1946-1965
A brand name belonging to kart engine maker Italian American Motor Engineering
Yellow parilla (Menispermum canadense), a flowering plant
Jennifer Parilla (1981), American trampolinist

See also
Parrilla (disambiguation)
Perilla (disambiguation)